International Telecommunications Public Correspondence Service (ITPCS) is an International Telecommunication Union (ITU) proposal for allocation of country code 991 for use in some form of individual-based international numbering plan.

The service may have been intended for ENUM trials, as the ITU allocated the range 991 001 to Neustar for use in trial in 2002. However, the most recent approved ENUM trial, with Telesoft Technologies's Sentiro, was allocated space in the Universal personal telecommunications (UPT) range (country code 878). No other allocations have been reported in 991.

Application templates addressed to the ITU for E.164 shared country codes and identification codes require descriptions of the "Public Correspondence Service" to be provided with those codes.

References

International Telecommunication Union